Sabujá (Sapoya), or Pedra Branca, is an extinct Karirian language of northeastern Bahia, Brazil. It is sometimes considered a dialect of a single Kariri language.

It is documented in a word list by von Martius (1867).

References 

Kariri languages
Extinct languages of South America